Ancylis discigerana, the birch leaffolder or yellow birch leaffolder moth, is a moth of the family Tortricidae. It is found in north-eastern North America.

The wingspan is 13–14 mm. There is one generation per year.

The larvae feed on Betula alleghaniensis. The first two instars skeletonise the lower surface of a leaf of their host plant. They feed from beneath a sheet of silk that is constructed between two lateral veins. Third instar larvae move to the upper surface of a different leaf and fold it lengthwise. They then feed on the upper epidermis within the fold until the leaf falls down.

Gallery

References

Moths described in 1863
Enarmoniini
Moths of North America